Guy IV (Guido or Wido; assassinated 897) was the Duke of Spoleto and Camerino from 889 and Prince of Benevento from 895. He was the son of Guy II of Spoleto.

In either 888, when his father was crowned King of France, or 889, when his father was crowned King of Italy, Guy was granted the Duchies of Spoleto and Camerino. Though his father never secured the French kingdom, he did maintain his Italian crown and thus happily divested himself of his responsibilities in Spoleto itself, the hereditary possession of his family. Guy was a capable warrior and leader. He conquered Benevento from the eastern Romans and made himself prince there (895). He offered the regency of his conquered principality to Guaimar I of Salerno, the husband of his sister Itta, but Guaimar was captured en route to Benevento by Adelfer, the gastald of Avellino. Guy had to go down and besiege Avellino to get his release.

After reigning in Benevento for a year and eight months, Guy travelled to Rome to meet the Emperor Lambert. He was murdered on the Tiber by agents of Alberic, who seized Spoleto and set himself up as duke.

Notes

Sources
 Caravale, Mario (ed). Dizionario Biografico degli Italiani: LX Grosso – Guglielmo da Forlì. Rome, 2003.
 Caravale, Mario (ed). Dizionario Biografico degli Italiani: LXI Guglielmo Gonzaga – Javobini. Rome, 2003.
Lexikon des Mittelalters: Wido IV. Herzog von Spoleto  (882/83-897).

|-

9th-century dukes of Spoleto
Princes of Benevento
Lombard warriors
Guideschi dynasty
Margraves of Italy
Assassinated Italian people
9th-century births
897 deaths

Year of birth unknown
9th-century Lombard people